Bielecki Island is an island  north of Trundy Island in the western part of the Joubin Islands. It was named by the Advisory Committee on Antarctic Names after Johannes N. Bielecki, an assistant engineer in RV Hero on her first Antarctic voyage to Palmer Station in 1968.

See also 
 List of Antarctic and sub-Antarctic islands

References 

Islands of the Palmer Archipelago